Goljek is a small settlement in the Municipality of Trebnje in eastern Slovenia. It lies on the road between Čatež and Račje Selo in the hills north of Trebnje. The area is part of the historical region of Lower Carniola. The municipality is now included in the Southeast Slovenia Statistical Region.

In Goljek there is a small Buddhist forest hermitage called Samaṇadīpa.

References

External links
Goljek at Geopedia

Populated places in the Municipality of Trebnje